"Rock the Night" is a single released by the Swedish band Europe. The song was written by vocalist Joey Tempest in 1984 and premiered on the band's Wings of Tomorrow tour the same year.

The song was released in two different versions, just more than a year and a half apart from each other- in 1985 as a single from the soundtrack to the Swedish film On the Loose, and in 1986 as the second international single from the album The Final Countdown. The original 1985 release has a rawer, more metallic hard rock sound than the more polished version released from The Final Countdown the following year.  The B-side for both releases was a 1985 re-recording of the band's debut single, "Seven Doors Hotel".

The 1986 release became a Top 10 hit in France, Germany, Holland, Spain, Belgium, Ireland and Switzerland, and peaked at #12 on the UK Singles Chart and #30 on the Billboard Hot 100 chart in the United States in 1987.

The song was included in the 2007 film Hot Rod and the European version of the Nintendo DS game Guitar Hero: On Tour.

Music videos 
There were two music videos released for "Rock the Night," one corresponding to each of the different versions.

The original 1985 version, apparently directly incorporated into the On the Loose film, features the band performing the song on stage, interspersed with shots of various audience members singing along and otherwise observing/reacting to the song.

The second video was directed by Nick Morris and shot at the Hard Rock Cafe in Stockholm. It was the first Europe music video to feature the band's new guitarist, Kee Marcello, since the original guitarist John Norum (who had recorded the guitar parts) had left the band weeks before the video shoot. The video begins with Europe drinking in a car before walking into the Hard Rock Cafe, where the people inside are watching a video...of Europe's "Rock the Night." Joey begins singing while the band is looking at the Cafe's order menu. The other band members use forks and other improvised "instruments" to mime to the music. The rest of the people inside soon become a crowd, clapping and cheering them on. Live footage was also included, although overdubbed by the studio version of the song. After the chorus, Joey uses a ketchup bottle as an imaginary microphone, before the waiter delivers a real wireless one. Right before the solo, Kee removes a guitar from the Cafe's wall. They take the stage during the solo and perform the remainder of the song.

Personnel
Joey Tempest − lead vocals and backing vocals
John Norum − electric guitar and backing vocals
John Levén − electric bass and backing vocals
Mic Michaeli − synthesizers and backing vocals
Ian Haugland − drums

Chart positions

References 

1985 songs
1985 singles
1986 singles
Europe (band) songs
Epic Records singles
Songs written by Joey Tempest